Persatuan Sepak Bola Indonesia Tangerang Under-20, who are commonly referred to as Persita Tangerang U-20 or simply as Persita U-20, is an Indonesian football club based in Tangerang, Indonesia.

Former player 
  Abdul Rahman 
  Maulana (promotion to main team)
  Rishadi Fauzi (promotion to main team)

Achievements & honors
Indonesia Super League U-21 
Runner-up (1): 2009

All time top scorer

References 

Football clubs in Indonesia